Lisin is a Russian masculine surname; its feminine counterpart is Lisina. It originates from the Russian masculine given name Lisa, which means fox and is unrelated to the feminine given name Lisa. It may refer to
Enver Lisin (born 1986), Russian ice hockey forward
Gennadiy Aygi (born Lisin; 1934–2006), Chuvash poet and a translator
Vladimir Lisin (born 1956), Russian steel tycoon 
Yekaterina Lisina (born 1987), Russian basketball player

References

Russian-language surnames